Shineray Group is a Chinese conglomerate. The group is the owner of the Italian motorcycle brand SWM.

Shineray Group also formed a joint venture with Brilliance Auto Group to produce SWM branded automobile and motorcycle in Chongqing, China.

SRM Shineray
SRM Shineray is the NEV brand of Shineray Group which cooperates with Brilliance Automotive. Brilliance Automotive sells light commercial vehicles under the Jinbei brand which shares the platform for electric SRM Shineray light commercial vehicles. Prior to Brilliance, SRM had a working relationship with FAW, which was terminated.

As of October 2020, the DST Shenzhou No.5 (DST神州5号) by Hangtianshenzhou Automobiles (航天神州汽车) based on the SRM Shineray Haoyun No.1 was revealed, with the model being a rebadge despite still wearing the SRM Shineray logo.

Products
SRM Shineray products are rebadged vehicles based on Jinbei products.

Microvans
SRM Shineray X30L
SRM Shineray X30LEV
SRM Shineray Haoyun No.1
SRM Shineray Haoyun No.2
SRM Shineray Small Haise EV
SRM Jinhaishi M

Light trucks
SRM Shineray T20S
SRM Shineray T20EV
SRM Shineray T22S
SRM Shineray T30S
SRM Shineray T32S
SRM Shineray T50EV

References

External links
 

holding companies of China